Celso Golmayo y Zúpide (24 April 1820, in Logroño, Spain – 1 April 1898, in Havana) was a Spanish–Cuban chess master.

He had been generally accepted as Cuban champion since his 1862 match defeat of Félix Sicre. He took part in the famous Paris 1867 tournament where he tied for 7–8th (Ignatz von Kolisch won).

In matches, he won against Paul Morphy 3 : 2 at Havana 1864 (blind simultan., Morphy gave odds of a knight); lost to Gustav Neumann 0 : 3 in Paris in 1867; lost twice to Wilhelm Steinitz 2 : 9 in 1883 and 0 : 5 in 1888; won twice against Andrés Clemente Vázquez 7 : 0 in 1887 and 7 : 4 in 1890; lost thrice to George Henry Mackenzie 3 : 6 and 0.5 : 5.5 in 1887; and 4.5 : 7.5 in 1888; lost to Joseph Henry Blackburne 4 : 6 in 1891; and lost to Emanuel Lasker 0.5 : 2.5 in 1893, all in Havana.

Celso Golmayo y Zúpide was the father of Celso Golmayo y de la Torriente and Manuel Golmayo y de la Torriente.

He is also known as the professor of Raul Jose Capablanca. He played several games with Jose when he was a child. Confessed he could not give a Knight advantage to the kid.

References

Further reading

External links
 

1820 births
1898 deaths
Spanish chess players
Cuban chess players
Migrants from Spain to Spanish Cuba
19th-century chess players